Reshmeh (also Romanized as Rashmeh and Rishmeh) is a village in Howmeh Rural District, in the Central District of Garmsar County, Semnan Province, Iran. At the 2006 census, its population was 189, in 57 families. Rashmeh is surrounded to Kardevan from north, Saadabd and Mahmood abad Osanloo from south, Mahmood Abad Nayeb Ebrahim from west and Salman from east. Three main families living in Rashmeh are Rashmei, Yourdkhani and Mirakhori. Their profession is mostly farming. Yellow melon, cotton, wheat and barley are the products of farmers. Recently, young generation has migrated to Garmsar and Tehran and few families are living in Rashmeh.

References 

Populated places in Garmsar County